Polypedates colletti (Collett's tree frog, Collett's treefrog, Collett's whipping frog or black-spotted tree frog) is a species of frog in the family Rhacophoridae. It is found in the Malay Peninsula (Thailand and Malaysia), southern Vietnam, Borneo, Sumatra, and islands of the South China Sea (including Natuna Islands).

Etymology
The specific name colletti honours Robert Collett, Norwegian zoologist.

Description
Males can reach  and females  in snout–vent length. The snout is conspicuously acute. The tympanum is distinct. The dorsum is usually brownish or grayish, and most individuals have an hour-glass pattern in their back. The belly is whitish-cream. The throat may have dark vermiculations. The limbs have darkish cross-bars.

Habitat and conservation
During the breeding, it forms aggregations around temporary rain pools; adults perch at  height in the vegetation. It is potentially threatened by habitat loss. It is found in a number of protected areas.

References

External links
 Sound recordings of Polypedates colletti at BioAcoustica

colletti
Amphibians of Indonesia
Amphibians of Malaysia
Amphibians of Thailand
Amphibians of Vietnam
Amphibians of Borneo
Fauna of Sumatra
Amphibians described in 1890
Taxa named by George Albert Boulenger
Taxonomy articles created by Polbot